For the USAF unmanned Quail drone aircraft, see ADM-20 Quail.
The IMCO CallAir A-9 is a small agricultural aircraft that first flew in 1962, a development of the company's previous successful crop-dusters.  It is typical of aircraft of its type - a single-seat aircraft with a low wing incorporating spraying gear.

Design and development
Following the purchase of Call Aircraft Company, who had built the CallAir Model A series of light utility and agricultural aircraft, by Intermountain Manufacturing Company (IMCO) in 1962, IMCO produced a new agricultural derivative of the Callair, the CallAir A-9.  Production of the new aircraft started in 1963.

Like the earlier CallAir aircraft, the A-9 is a single-engined monoplane with a braced low wing. It is of mixed construction, with a fabric-covered steel-tube fuselage structure and a wood-and-fabric wing. The pilot sits behind the chemical hopper, and the cockpit is enclosed by two removable, bottom-hinged doors that form the left and right side windows.  The aircraft is powered by a single Lycoming O-540 flat-six piston engine. Later, some A-9s have been adapted for glider towing operations.

IMCO was in turn purchased by Rockwell International in 1966, which built the plane under its Aero Commander division before shifting production to Mexico in 1971, under a joint venture there called AAMSA.  Production continued until 1984.

Variants
A-9
Original variant, powered by a 235 hp (175 kW) Lycoming O-540-B2B5. Built by IMCO and Aero Commander (as the Sparrow Commander)

B-1
Enlarged A-9 with a 400 hp (298 kW) Lycoming IO-720-A1A engine and 42 ft 8 in (13.00 m) wingspan. First flight January 15, 1966. Built by IMCO and Aero Commander (as the Snipe Commander).

A-9 Super
Version with 290 hp (216 kW) Lycoming IO-540. Built by Aero Commander (as the Quail Commander) and by AAMSA (as the A9B-M Quail)

Specifications (AAMSA A9B-M Quail)

See also

References
Notes

Bibliography
 
 Taylor, John W. R. Jane's All The World's Aircraft 1965-66. London: Sampson Low, Marston & Company, 1965. 
 Taylor, John W. R. Jane's All The World's Aircraft 1966-67. London: Sampson Low, Marston & Company, 1966. 
 Taylor, John W. R. Jane's All The World's Aircraft 1982-83. London:Jane's Yearbooks, 1982. .

External links

1970s Mexican agricultural aircraft
1960s United States agricultural aircraft
Low-wing aircraft
Aero Commander aircraft
Single-engined tractor aircraft
Aircraft first flown in 1963